MV Moonta is a 1931 built Australian coastal passenger ship. Later in life she became the landlocked casino ship and tourist attraction Casino Le Lydia in Le Barcarès, France.

Service years 
Moonta was launched in June 1931 Burmeister & Wain shipyard in Copenhagen, Denmark for the Adelaide Steamship Company. She started service with a six-day itinerary, disembarking in Adelaide and ending in Port Lincoln, usually with four or five calls along the way.  Moonta became well known and beloved for her excellent service and relaxing voyages, being called the perfect "romantic holiday" ship. After serving in World War II Moonta continued her Australian coastal service until 1955, when Moonta was sold to the Greek Hellenic Mediterranean Lines for cruising. With this her new owners doubled her passenger capacity and renamed her Lydia. She remained in Greek cruise service until 1966, when Hellenic Mediterranean laid her up.

Leisure complex service 
In 1967 SEMETA, a company based in the French resort towns of Leucate and Barcarès bought Lydia to be the maritime symbol of a new innovative hotel opening that year. The new Casino Le Lydia was taken to Marseilles, where her propellers and engines were removed. The ship was then   landlocked onto a beach in Le Barcarès, the first building in a planned tourism complex. In 1974 a Japanese company bought Casino Le Lydia and added several new features to her. In 1997 the ship ran into trouble when the government closed her down due to new Safety of Life at Sea regulations that came out that year, even though Casino Le Lydia was now considered a building. After lying derelict for three years the Partouche Group bought and restored the ship. As of 2005 complex's features include a casino, restaurant, bar, discotheque, a pool with a waterslide, spa, as well as an exhibition center.

References

Ships of South Australia
Ocean liners
1931 ships
Ships built in Copenhagen
Cruise ships of Greece
Gambling ships